Nancy Denson is an American politician who served as mayor of U.S. city of Athens, Georgia, from 2011 to 2019. First elected mayor in 2010 and re-elected in 2014, Denson has been in public service since 1980 starting as an Athens City Council member.

Background
Nancy Denson was born in Memphis, Tennessee. She was the third of seven children. She married Bob Denson and moved to Athens in 1966. She attended the University of Georgia where she obtained a BBA degree. She also earned a certificate in public management from the Carl Vinson Institute of Government, also part of UGA.

Political career

Athens City Council member
Denson was elected as a council member for the Athens City Council in 1980, becoming the first woman to hold this position. She served as the president of the 10th District and was a member of all council committees.

Clarke County Tax Commissioner

Mayor
The nonpartisan 2010 General Election was held on November 2, 2010, and Nancy Denson beat both 20-year-old UGA student Glenn Stegall and former mayor of Athens Gwen O'Looney to be elected mayor of Athens-Clarke County.  On May 22, 2018, county commissioner Kelly Girtz was elected to replace Denson as mayor of Athens-Clarke County. Denson was ineligible to seek a third term due to term limits.

See also

List of people from Memphis, Tennessee
List of University of Georgia people
 Timeline of Athens, Georgia

References

External links
Official website of the Mayor of Athens-Clarke County

Mayors of places in Georgia (U.S. state)
Women mayors of places in Georgia (U.S. state)
People from Memphis, Tennessee
Georgia (U.S. state) Democrats
University of Georgia alumni
Living people
Year of birth missing (living people)
21st-century American politicians
21st-century American women politicians